The common opossum (Didelphis marsupialis), also called the southern or black-eared opossum or gambá, and sometimes called a possum, is a marsupial species living from the northeast of Mexico to Bolivia (reaching the coast of the South Pacific Ocean to the central coast of Peru), including Trinidad and Tobago in the Caribbean, where it is called manicou. It prefers the woods, but can also live in fields and cities.

Habitat and shelter
This opossum is found in tropical and subtropical forest, both primary and secondary, at altitudes up to 2200 m. They use a wide range of nest sites. Most commonly they will create one in the hollow of a tree; however, they will also dig a burrow or nest in any dark location if nothing else is suitable (which often gets them in trouble with humans). Opossums enjoy denning underground, but do not spend as much time underground when it is dry season.  Common predators of the opossum are humans, house pets (ex: dogs and cats), and birds. When they are in danger, they act dead, also called, 'playing opossum.'

Description

The common opossum is similar in size to a house cat. The fur of the opossum is actually yellow in the under-fur, but is hidden by the longer black guard-hairs that cover it, while the tail, fingers, and face are lighter "with the tail being without fur, somewhat similar to a giant rat tail". It can measure nearly 20 inches long. It has large ears that are usually black, and its face is usually a pale peach in color, with black whiskers and eyes that reflect reddish in light. With a body length of nearly a foot, and a tail that can reach almost two feet, the common opossum is one of the larger members of its family. An adult can weigh more than three pounds.

Behavior
Their activity is mainly nocturnal and terrestrial, with some arboreal exploration and nesting. Outside of mating, they are usually solitary. A male opossum's home range (distance traveled at night) can vary in size from wet to dry seasons while a female has a more stationary home range when she is breeding.  Males are most active between 11 pm and 3 am at night. They are considered pests due to their somewhat raccoon-like behavior. Raiding trash cans, nesting in locations that are not suitable, and causing mayhem if encountered within a human living space, they are often trapped and killed. Opossums have not been observed to be territorial. The common opossum is a host of the acanthocephalan intestinal parasite Gigantorhynchus lutzi.

Common predators of the opossum are humans, house pets (ex: dogs and cats), and birds. When they are in danger, they act dead, also called, 'playing opossum'.

Diet
Common opossums have a broad ability to adapt to environmental changes, and their teeth allow them to eat many different types of food, which is obtained mostly on the ground. They can eat insects (such as beetles and grasshoppers) and other invertebrates (such as earthworms), small vertebrates (toads [such as cane toads], snakes [such as South American rattlesnakes], birds [such as lance-tailed manakins], and small mammals), fruits, vegetables, nectar, and also carrion. In urban areas, they may find articles of food in compost piles and garbage cans. Their ability to digest almost anything edible gives them a broader range than a human.

Reproduction
The female will have 5-9 offspring between one and three times per year after maturity. The mother raises the young by herself. The common opossum can mate for the majority of the calendar year. They do not mate for life. Female opossums can give birth to at most 24 infants, however, only a third of them usually survive. Young opossums stay with the mother for the first few months of their lives and reach maturity before they are a year old.

Lifespan
The common opossum lives for around 2-4 years.

Classification
They are members of the genus Didelphis, which contains the largest American opossums, and the order Didelphimorphia, to which all Western hemisphere opossums belong. The common opossum is currently not an endangered species.

References

Opossums
Marsupials of North America
Marsupials of Central America
Marsupials of South America
Mammals of the Caribbean
Mammals of Mexico
Mammals of Trinidad and Tobago
Mammals of Bolivia
Mammals of Brazil
Mammals of Colombia
Mammals of Ecuador
Mammals of French Guiana
Mammals of Guyana
Mammals of Paraguay
Mammals of Peru
Mammals of Suriname
Mammals of Venezuela
Mammals described in 1758
Taxa named by Carl Linnaeus